Dearing is a town in McDuffie County, Georgia, United States. The population was 529 at the 2020 census. It is part of the Augusta metropolitan area.

History
An early variant name was "Lombardy". A post office called Lombardy was established in 1823, and the name was changed to Dearing in 1893. The Georgia General Assembly incorporated the place in 1910 as the "Town of Dearing". The present name is after William Dearing, a railroad official.

Geography
Dearing is located in southeastern McDuffie County at  (33.413425, -82.384781). U.S. Routes 78 and 278 run together through the town, leading northwest  to Thomson, the county seat, and east  to Harlem.

The town is drained to the south by tributaries of Headstall Creek, which flows south to Brier Creek, a tributary of the Savannah River.

Demographics

As of the census of 2000, there were 441 people, 178 households, and 126 families residing in the town. The racial makeup of the town was 95.01% White, 4.54% African American, 0.23% from other races, and 0.23% from two or more races. Hispanic or Latino people of any race were 0.91% of the population.

There were 178 households, out of which 31.5% had children under the age of 18 living with them, 58.4% were married couples living together, 9.0% had a female householder with no husband present, and 28.7% were non-families. 24.7% of all households were made up of individuals, and 15.2% had someone living alone who was 65 years of age or older.  The average household size was 2.48 and the average family size was 2.98.

In the town, the population was spread out, with 34.0% under the age of 18, 9.5% from 18 to 24, 28.6% from 25 to 44, 24.9% from 45 to 64, and 15.0% who were 65 years of age or older.  The median age was 36 years. For every 150 females there were 290.9 males.  For every 200 females age 18 and over, there were 388.2 males.

The median income for a household in the town was $27,917, and the median income for a family was $38,438. Males had a median income of $27,083 versus $19,375 for females. The per capita income for the town was $12,728.  About 11.3% of families and 18.6% of the population were below the poverty line, including 18.8% of those under age 18 and 32.6% of those age 65 or over.

See also

Central Savannah River Area

References

Towns in McDuffie County, Georgia
Towns in Georgia (U.S. state)
Augusta metropolitan area